The King Drive-In is a historic drive-in theater located in Russellville, Alabama. It is the oldest continually operating drive-in theater in the state of Alabama.

History
The King Drive-In began showing films in 1949 when it was originally owned by namesake A.L. King. King's son, Morgan, took over operations in 1974. Traditionally, the theater screened films throughout the summer at this time when local children and teenagers were out of school. In more recent years, the drive in has opened earlier during the Spring and also remained open into the Fall.

Today 
The King Drive-In remains among the last currently operating drive-in theater in North Alabama. It has survived for more than 60 years in Franklin County, despite the additions of digital screens in Florence, Alabama, as well as the attraction of area high school football games during the fall months. It has upgraded its facilities to include the transmission of sound through FM radio, as well as an upgraded screen and projector.

Currently, the King Drive-In plays a double and sometimes triple features on Friday, Saturday and Sunday nights. Trailers for upcoming films are played in between films to give customers time for concessions or a restroom break. The location is known as a gathering point for area youths and family on summer weekend nights.

References

External links

King Drive-In at Drive-Ins.com

1949 establishments in Alabama
Cinemas and movie theaters in Alabama
Tourist attractions in Franklin County, Alabama
Drive-in theaters in the United States